Originally in an area named "Bonney's Flat", Bonney Flat Creek is a few kilometres west of Balhannah, South Australia, where the Camac family were prominent settlers. This is the site of the historic Bonney Flat Cemetery.

Early farmers in that area included the Hannaford family.

References 

Towns in South Australia